The 2010–11 season was Port Vale's 99th season of football in the English Football League, and third successive season in League Two. Vale enjoyed a solid start to the campaign, looking like good prospects for promotion. However Micky Adams left the club in December to take charge of Sheffield United, leaving the promotion push to be finished by new man Jim Gannon. Gannon's traumatic reign ended after just two months; his exit confirmed after players, staff and fans turned against him. Vale exited the FA Cup at the Third Round, and left both the League Cup and the League Trophy at the Second Round. In the background, numerous groups and individuals expressed their willingness to purchase the club. The board turned away these investors – to the anger of some fans, who formed a 'Black and Gold' campaign demanding that the club be sold.

The turbulence of Gannon's reign, typified by a bust-up on a pre-match journey that became known as 'busgate', and the boardroom battle between multi-millionaire Water World owner Mo Chaudry and Bill Bratt's Valiant 2001 led some to call the season a 'soap opera farce'. At the end of the campaign Micky Adams returned as manager, giving fans cause for optimism following a highly disappointing season.

Overview

League Two
Before the start of the season there was speculation that manager Micky Adams would be approached by his former employers at Championship side Leicester City, having impressed in his position at Port Vale. Adams continued to make his mark at Vale though, releasing nine players, and signing Sean Rigg, Stuart Tomlinson, Justin Richards, Ritchie Sutton and Gary Roberts. Lewis Haldane was rushed into hospital after being bitten by an insect during a training session, forcing him to miss the first half of the season. Adams drafted in Reading winger Abdulai Bell-Baggie as a loan replacement for Haldane, and after an initial one-month period then replaced Bell-Baggie with Milton Keynes Dons loanee Jemal Johnson.

After his side won their opening four away league fixtures for the first time in their history, talks began to extend Adams' contract beyond 2012 as early as September 2010. Five wins in five for September saw Adam's gifted the League Two Manager of the Month award, his team also boasting five clean sheets. In October, Anthony Malbon was loaned out to Newcastle Town, and was later released so as to allow him to join Leek Town permanently. Taking Malbon's place on the bench was Jake Speight, who joined on a two-month loan from Bradford City. Micky Adams was also handed the award for November, after his club advanced into the Third Round of the FA Cup and rose to the top of the League Two table on the back of five clean sheets in seven games. For his strong performances, John McCombe was also nominated for the League Two player of the month award. Departing for his boyhood club Sheffield United at the end of December 2010, Micky Adams left Vale in second position in League Two, though on a poor run of form.

Jim Gannon was confirmed as manager on 6 January, signing a contract that lasted until summer 2012. Saying that finishing outside of the top seven would be a failure, the Cheshire-based manager's first task after 'burying the hatchet' with Gareth Owen was to look for a new striker, as injuries struck down both Marc Richards and Doug Loft. Two weeks into his reign club captain Tommy Fraser left the club by mutual consent, and signed with Barnet. Marc Richards was handed the captaincy. Gannon brought in Romaine Sawyers and Kayleden Brown on loan from West Bromwich Albion, Jay O'Shea on loan from Birmingham City, Exodus Geohaghon on loan from Peterborough United, and striker Tom Pope on loan from Rotherham United. Losing four of his first five games in charge, Gannon was forced to respond to criticism over his team selections and substitutions, and announced plans to expand the club's non-playing staff. On 1 February the players met with the chairman and rumours spread that Gannon had 'lost the dressing room', as comparisons were made with the tenure of Brian Clough in The Damned United. Yet the next day an O'Shea volley gave Vale a 1–0 win over promotion rivals Rotherham United to give Gannon his first win in charge at the club.

However tension remained, as proven at the end of the month when it was reported that Gannon left the team bus on a pre-match journey after rowing with assistant manager Geoff Horsfield (who had been appointed by Adams). Gannon had previously told the press his staff were 'underqualified', though insisted any changes would be 'implemented at a later stage' and that Horsfield was a 'great assistant'. This came on the same day that local paper The Sentinel ran an editorial that questioned his loan signings, his decision to drop Gary Roberts and branded his tactics and team selections as baffling. After Horsfield was told to stay away from the club for two weeks he was invited back to his assistant role as before, with no disciplinary action taken against either party. As the club fell to seventh in the tale, Gannon made another loan signing by bringing Dominic Blizzard in from Bristol Rovers. Results continued to go against the Vale though, as on 19 March they lost 3–0 at Accrington Stanley, and as a result dropped out of the play-off zone for the first time in the season. Ugly post-match scenes at the Crown Ground saw Geohaghon confront fans who singled him out for abuse, whilst Gannon was ushered quietly out of the back door. Roberts told the media "I don't think the manager likes me and, to be honest, I don't like him". Rumours circulated that Gannon would soon be on his way out. These rumours were proved accurate two days later, as Gannon's departure was confirmed by the club. Loan signing Blizzard also left. Mark Grew took over as caretaker-manager, though following a 2 April defeat to leaders Chesterfield he was forced to admit that automatic promotion was now out of reach. Later in the month Grew released Kristian Cox, before a home defeat to bottom of the table Stockport County on 23 April meant that winning their remaining three games no longer guaranteed them a play-off spot. Their penultimate game of the season was a 7–2 mauling of Morecambe, which saw Louis Dodds and Justin Richards score the first hat-tricks at Vale Park since Martin Foyle hit three in 1994. This was also the club's biggest home victory in more than fifty years. The final game of the season saw a celebratory pitch invasion at Underhill, as Barnet secured their Football League season with a 1–0 victory over Vale.

They finished in eleventh place with 65 points, one position and three points less than the previous campaign. Only Stevenage conceded fewer goals, though outside of the bottom two only Bradford City and Hereford United scored fewer goals. They finished three points short of the play-offs following a point deduction to Torquay United, and finished behind Crewe Alexandra on goal difference. Marc Richards was top-scorer for the third successive season, this time netting twenty goals in all competitions. Justin Richards finished with fourteen goals, and no other player managed to hit double figures.

At the end of the season Doug Loft and Adam Yates signed new two-year deals. Gareth Owen had announced a move to rivals Crewe Alexandra, however when Micky Adams signed a three-year contract to return as manager, Owen reversed his decision and signed a two-year deal as player-coach at Vale Park. Only full-back Kris Taylor and youth team graduate Matthew Bell were not offered new contracts by Adams. Taylor moved on to Darlington and Bell signed with Mansfield Town – both Conference clubs. Defender Sutton also made the switch to Mansfield. However chief scout Ray Williams did not have his contract renewed, after 39 years of service to the club, after falling out with the board.

Finances & ownership issues
On the financial side, in the pre-season investor Mike Newton announced that he was willing to invest £400,000 in the club and take the chair of the board. Chairman Bill Bratt claimed to be unhappy with Newton's policy of negotiating in public (who had by then upped his offer to £500,000), and so Bratt remained as chairman. Newton claimed that his "efforts to become chairman and to invest in the club have been hampered and made almost impossible" by Bratt and his board, and said that the reasons giving to reject his investment were "one long round of excuses". Bratt was forced to deny claims by Newton that the club were heading for administration under his leadership. In September 2010 Bratt gave up his role as chief executive, but remained as chairman, denying that this decision was influenced by the recent Newton takeover bid. By this time the club's debts were estimated at around £2m, a level described by Bratt as "manageable". The nine-man board's share total was valued at £359,400.

In December 2010 local businessman and Water World owner Mo Chaudry went public with his investment proposal for the club, however Bratt said it was the first he had heard of the proposal, despite Chandry's legal advisor's claims they had spoken and that "it was made clear to me the club wasn't interested in selling to Mo Chaudry." The board swiftly and unanimously rejected the £1.3 million proposal. Following another anti-board protest from Vale supporters and the resignation of director Mike Thompstone, Bratt and his team decided to re-examine the Chaudry bid. In January 2011, another group of prospective investors, this time a group of Texas businessmen, announced they had pulled out of talks with Bratt's board. The group said: "the deal is completely dead because the directors don't want to sell the club... we believe they [the Vale] are run by the wrong people... [and] we didn't get anything apart from a cup of tea before watching a game." Fans began a protest movement called "Black and Gold Until it's Sold" – inspired by Manchester United's anti-Glazer scarf protest – in which fans wore black and gold scarves to symbolise their opposition to Bratt and the board.

By February, Chaudry had agreed to sign a confidentiality agreement, and face-to-face negotiations began. Chaudry was keen to accelerate the negotiations, accusing Bratt of stalling. Chaudry had the stadium revalued at £3.4m, some £2.3m less than stated in the board's accounts – Staffordshire University academic Ian Jackson commented that these were a part of the "skirmishes of negotiation". Despite this Chaudry's 12 March takeover deadline passed without comment from the Vale board, though another director, Paul Humphreys, resigned his position. Chaudry then teamed up with another local businessmen, Mark Sims, to purchase the maximum allowed 24.9% of shares each (to give them a combined total of 49.8% control). In addition to the 'Black and Gold' campaign, two further fan-based organisations, 'Starve Em Out' and 'North London Valiants', attempted to oust Bratt and his directors out of power at the club. Simms and Chaudry withdrew their joint bid after the Vale directors refused to discuss the proposal, calling the duo's proposal "not at all valid". Further resignations took the Vale board down to just five members.

Facing an EGM, Chaudry's cause was boosted when Broxap CEO Robert Lee announced that he would sell his £50,000 worth of shares to Chaudry, making the board's removal at the EGM more likely (however Broxap later reversed their decision on the day of the EGM). However just ten days before the EGM Bratt announced a ten-year £1.6 million sponsorship deal with Ameriturf Global Sports. A further twist came five days later, when Robbie Williams handed his 24.9% worth of EGM proxy votes over to Port Vale Supporters' Club. Many believed this would ensure the end of Bratt's reign, despite his warning that fans should "look at other clubs who have gone down this line and they have no longer got their ground and are paying vast sums in rent". The result of the EGM was a vote of no confidence in the board; directors Peter Jackson and Stan Meigh were voted out, however the controversial '24.9% rule' survived – to Chaudry's disappointment. Also remaining were chairman Bill Bratt and directors Glenn Oliver and Mike Lloyd, three of the original nine that started the season. Each facing an individual vote, they received 51.07%, 50.64%, and 50.21% of the vote respectively. The three survived as Broxap sold their shares to an unnamed director at the last minute, not to Chaudry as they had originally promised. Speaking of the change of heart from Broxap, Chaudry stated that "the board have engaged in dirty tricks from day one and there have been more at the 11th hour." Many fans expressed disappointment at the result, though Chaudry again announced he "will not walk away". The future remained unclear, with both Bratt and Chaudry taking gains and losses from the EGM. The club's constitution required four directors for the board to be considered valid, and so the board welcomed new director Mark Sims, a Chaudry supporter, who was voted on to the board at the EGM after he was sponsored by Robbie Williams. Sims stated his intention of convincing the three original directors of the merits of Chaudry's bid. The board also invited supporters group North London Valiants to nominate a director. The EGM disrupted manager Micky Adams' transfer plans as the club's constitution stipulated that at least four directors must be in place for financial transactions such as issuing new contracts to take place. In a shock move Adams announced that he intended to take up a directorship at the club, purchasing £50,000 worth of shares with his own money (though former director Stan Meigh later said that it was he who provided the money) he declared that "this is a purely footballing decision... I understand that the last few months have been difficult for everyone and am asking all of our supporters to put their differences aside, to support my candidacy for the Board and then to get behind the team in the coming season." Supporters' groups opposed to Bill Bratt's chairmanship did not welcome the news. At the end of the season, Stoke-on-Trent city council confirmed that the two-year repayment holiday for a £2.25 million loan taken out in 2005 had come to an end.

Cup competitions
In the FA Cup, Vale nearly slipped up at Princes Park to Conference South Dartford, and were saved only by an 84th minute John McCombe header. Vale made no mistake in the replay, dispatching the "Darts" with a 4–0 win. They booked themselves a Third Round date at Turf Moor with Championship club Burnley with a 1–0 home win over Accrington Stanley. The Burnley game was Gannon's first game in charge, and resulted in a 4–2 defeat.

In the League Cup, Vale managed to defeat a Championship side by slaying high-flying Queens Park Rangers 3–1 at Loftus Road, new signing Richards scoring twice. Premier League opposition proved to be too much of a challenge however, as a strong Fulham side destroyed the Vale 6–0 at Craven Cottage – Zoltán Gera and Bobby Zamora both bagging braces.

In the League Trophy, both the Richards strikers struck down Rochdale with a 2–1 win. League One Carlisle United awaited in the Second Round at Brunton Park, and vanquished the "Valiants" on penalties following a 2–2 draw.

Results

Football League Two

League table

Results by matchday

Matches

FA Cup

League Cup

League Trophy

Player statistics

Appearances

Top scorers

Disciplinary record

Sourced from Soccerway.

Awards

Transfers

Transfers in

Transfers out

Loans in

Loans out

References
Specific

General
Soccerbase

Port Vale F.C. seasons
Port Vale